Xuelong Li is a professor and National Distinguished Chair at the Northwestern Polytechnical University (NWPU) working in artificial intelligence and computer vision.

Education
Li entered the University of Science and Technology of China in 1994 and later graduated with a master's degree and a doctoral degree.

Awards 
Li was named a Fellow of the Institute of Electrical and Electronics Engineers (IEEE) in 2011 (in the fellows class of 2012), "for contributions to pattern recognition and its applications in multimedia signal processing". He was elected a Member of the Academia Europaea in 2017. He is also a Fellow of the British Computer Society and a Fellow of the American Association for the Advancement of Science.

References

Living people
Year of birth missing (living people)
Place of birth missing (living people)
Chinese computer scientists
Fellow Members of the IEEE
Fellows of the British Computer Society
Fellows of the American Association for the Advancement of Science
Members of Academia Europaea